Mira Kremer (1905 – 19 October 1987) was a German chess player who twice won East Germany Women's Chess Championships (1949, 1951).

Chess career 
Mira Kremer won the German Women's Chess Championship of the Eastern Zone, which took place from July 23 to August 7, 1949 in Bad Klosterlausnitz. She also won the 2. German Women's Chess Championship of the German Democratic Republic from July 1 to 18, 1951 in Schwerin.

Other her top places in Germany and East Germany Women's Chess Championship were:
 in 1939 at 3rd place in 1939 in Stuttgart, which Friedl Rinder won;
 in 1950 at 3rd place in Sömmerda, which Edith Keller won;
 in 1951 at 3rd place in Bad Klosterlausnitz, which Edith Keller won;
 in 1952 at 2nd place in Schwerin, which Edith Keller-Herrmann won;
 in 1953 at 2nd place in Weißenfels, which Gertrud Nüsken won;
 in 1955 at 2nd place in Zwickau, which Gertrud Nüsken won.

References

External links 
 Wolfgang Pähtz: Damenschach in Ostdeutschland (Women's chess in East Germany). Selbstverlag des Autors 2017 (Reports, tables, games and pictures)
 Deutsche Meisterschaften der Frauen from TeleSchach
 2. Deutsche Damenmeisterschaft der DDR, 1951 in Schwerin with picture of the winner Mira Kremer

1905 births
1987 deaths
German female chess players
20th-century German women